David S. Jonas is a United States Marine, lawyer, and government official who is currently a partner at Fluet, Huber & Hoang. In 2017, he was nominated by President Donald Trump to become General Counsel at the United States Department of Energy, but Jonas withdrew from consideration in January 2018. He served for twenty years in the United States Marine Corps. During the administration of George W. Bush, Jonas served as The Pentagon's nuclear nonproliferation planner for the Joint Chiefs of Staff prior to becoming General Counsel of the National Nuclear Security Administration and the Defense Nuclear Facilities Safety Board. He was awarded the Defense Meritorious Service Medal for his work with the Joint Chiefs from 1997 to 2001.

Early life and education
Jonas is from Philadelphia, Pennsylvania. He received a BA from Denison University and his JD from Wake Forest University School of Law. He later attended The JAG School at the University of Virginia where he received his LLM.

Legal career
Jonas is an adjunct professor at Georgetown Law and George Washington University Law School. He is on the board of directors of the Naval War College Foundation, the Young Marines, and the Marine Executive Association. He is a member of the American Bar Association Advisory Committee on Law and National Security and the Advisory Committee of the University of Pennsylvania Law School's Center for Ethics and the Rule of Law. While serving in the United States Marine Corps Judge Advocate Division, Jonas argued Davis v. United States before the United States Supreme Court, becoming the first judge advocate in the history of the Army, Navy, Marine Corps and Air Force to appear before the U.S. Supreme Court.

Jonas was nominated by President Trump to become General Counsel at the Department of Energy on May 25, 2017. This nomination was reported favorably by the Committee on Energy and Natural Resources on September 19, 2017, but was never considered by the full Senate. It was returned unconfirmed to the President by the Senate on January 3, 2018, under Standing Rules of the United States Senate, Rule XXXI, paragraph 6. Before his nomination could be resubmitted, Jonas announced that he was withdrawing from consideration.

References

External links
 Biography at Georgetown Law

Living people
21st-century American lawyers
George W. Bush administration personnel
Denison University alumni
Wake Forest University School of Law alumni
Georgetown University alumni
Naval War College alumni
Year of birth missing (living people)
The Judge Advocate General's Legal Center and School alumni